Open Table Network (OTN) is a Christian charity which supports church communities for LGBT people and their allies.

History 
In June 2008, the first Open Table community was founded at St Bride's Church, Liverpool; by 2019, the network consisted of 17 communities in England and Wales. An article in the book Journeys in Grace and Truth, edited by Jayne Ozanne, describes the founding and history of Open Table.
In Christianity, "open table" refers to the custom of offering communion to all baptised Christians regardless of denomination.

Open Table began as a fresh expression hosted by the Team Parish of St Luke in the City, Liverpool, which is served by the churches of St Bride, St Dunstan, and St Michael in the City.
Miranda Threlfall-Holmes, Team Rector at St Luke in the City, advocates offering control of church organisations to marginalised groups, such as LGBT Christians; she describes Open Table as an "electrifying" example of this idea working successfully in practice.

In 2016, Paul Bayes, Bishop of Liverpool until February 2022, called for changes in the Church of England's attitudes to lesbian and gay people; recalling to The Guardian a visit to the Open Table congregation in Liverpool, he said: "I saw their faithfulness as Christians, often in difficult circumstances, sometimes in trying to say who they are within the church. I want to make room for a congregation like Open Table." In 2019, Bayes described Open Table as "one of the fastest growing Church planting movements in England".  

In 2019, Open Table successfully campaigned for the Home Office to grant Yew Fook Sam, a gay Malaysian, asylum for five years. The campaign started by Open Table and promoted by the Liverpool Echo gathered more than 5000 signatures to an online petition.

Kieran Bohan is Coordinator of the Open Table Network. He broadcast a reflection on Open Table as part of a BBC Radio 4 service led by Rachel Mann in September 2020. In May 2022, he and his partner celebrated the tenth anniversary of their civil partnership, the first in the UK to be celebrated in a religious building.

In 2020, the Open Table Network received a £15,000 grant from the National Lottery Community Fund to fund staff time and technology to help support members of OTN communities during the COVID-19 pandemic.

On 19 March 2021, the Charity Commission registered the Open Table Network as a Charitable Incorporated Organisation, whose charitable object is the "advancement of the Christian faith, in particular but not exclusively amongst lesbian, gay, bisexual, trans, queer, questioning, intersex or asexual Christians". The trustees are Alex Clare-Young (co-chair), Sarah Hobbs (co-chair), Anne Bennett, Augustine Tanner-Ihm, Lucy Berry, Neil Rees, and Rebekah Greenbank. At the time of registration, there were 18 Open Table communities. According to the charity's annual report for 2021, there were 21 communities by the end of that year.

Starting November 2020, new patrons of the Open Table Network introduced themselves on webinars. The new patrons are: Rachel Mann, John Bradbury, Bishop Cherry Vann, Pádraig Ó Tuama, Bishop Paul Bayes, John L. Bell, and Barbara Glasson.

In July 2021, Civil Society Consulting prepared a report for the Open Table Network, arguing that "LGBT Christians have been adversely affected by national lockdowns" and called for more support.

In November 2021, the Bishop of St Asaph Gregory Cameron blessed the civil partnership of Lee Taylor and Fabiano Da Silva Duarte at St Collen's Church in Llangollen. The ceremony was the first since blessing of same-sex couples was approved by the Church in Wales in September 2021. Kieran Bohan of the Open Table Network said: "It is heartwarming to see a bishop embrace a priest whose civil partnership he has just blessed."

In January 2023, the Church of England decided that same-sex couples could "give thanks" and "receive God's blessing" for their civil marriage or partnerships in church, but that Holy Matrimony continues "unchanged" to be between one man and one woman. Kieran Bohan said: "This is sad news. Other Christian denominations now welcome same-gender couples who wish to be joined in holy matrimony. We regret that England's own established church still denies LGBT+ people this equality."

References

External links
 Open Table Network YouTube channel
 Open Table Network website
 Open Table Network on Crowdfunder (2017)
Open Table Network on Crowdfunder (2019)
Open Table Network on Crowdfunder (2021)
 Words for worship services
Open Table Network on the Charity Commission website

Christian movements
LGBT Christian organizations
LGBT and Christianity
LGBT organisations in the United Kingdom
LGBT history in the United Kingdom
Christian organizations established in 2008
2008 establishments in the United Kingdom